Thynghowe was an important Viking Era open-air assembly place or , located at Sherwood Forest, in Nottinghamshire, England. It was lost to history until its rediscovery in 2005 by the husband and wife team of Stuart Reddish and Lynda Mallett, local history enthusiasts.

The assembly mound is at Hanger Hill,
close to a parish boundary stone.
As a result of continued research, Thynghowe is now included on the English Historic England Archive.

Name

Toponym

  The mound where the assembly meet 

Thynghowe: (Thyng..howe)

The first element  'Thyng'  is from Old Norse  ' Þing '  - ("thing")  ("assembly place").

The next element ' howe ' is from Old Norse  ' haugr '   ("mound" or "grave-mound" ).

Name history

The name changed and evolved over time :

 Þing-haugr - (Old Norse) c. 9-10th century

 Thing-haugr

  Thynghowe 

 hynger howe

 Hanger Hill - c. 17th century
 Thynghowe - rediscovered 2005

History
The site lies amidst the old oaks of an area known as the Birklands in Sherwood Forest.
Experts believe it may also yield clues as to the boundary of the ancient Anglo Saxon kingdoms of Mercia and Northumbria.

It functioned as a place where people came to resolve disputes and settle issues.

The name Thynghowe is of Old Norse origin, although the site may be older than the Danelaw, perhaps even Bronze Age.
The word howe often indicates the presence of a prehistoric burial mound.

The thyng or thing was historically the governing assembly in Germanic peoples
and was introduced into some Celtic societies as well. It was made up of the free people of the community and presided over by law-speakers.

Notes

Citations

Sources

Online

Gaunt, Andy (Jun. 30, 2011). A Topographic Earthwork Survey of Thynghowe, Hanger Hill, Nottinghamshire. NCA-016.
Stuart Reddish & Lynda Mallett: According to Ancient Custom: Research on the possible Origins and Purpose of Thynghowe Sherwood Forest

Books

Related reading
Community archaeology at Thynghowe, Birklands, Sherwood Forest by Lynda Mallett, Stuart Reddish, John Baker, Stuart Brookes and Andy Gaunt.Transactions of the Thoroton Society of Nottinghamshire, Volume 116 (2012)
Olwyn Owen (ed.) (2012) Things in the Viking World  (Shetland Amenity Trust)

External links
The News, History, and Archaeology of The Real Sherwood Forest
Things Viking

2005 archaeological discoveries
Buildings and structures in Nottinghamshire
Anglo-Norse England
Archaeological sites in Nottinghamshire
Thing (assembly)
Sherwood Forest